The Legend of Spyro is a game trilogy that is part of the Spyro series. It acts as a reboot to the original series. The games use a combination of close-combat and platforming gameplay, though more oriented on combat than previous games in the Spyro series. The story revolves around Spyro, the protagonist, and his efforts to stop Malefor, the Dark Master, from escaping his ancient imprisonment to bring about an armageddon upon the world.

The games received mixed reviews; the games' controls and story received much praise, while the gameplay was often criticized as being repetitive.

Setting 
The Legend of Spyro trilogy is set in a world populated by various creatures, with dragons being the most notable. Spyro is a young dragon who hails from a line of rare purple dragons who are born once every ten generations and prophesied to direct the fate of an era. While still an egg, he came under threat of The Dark Master Malefor, who sought to prevent the prophecies from coming true. Spyro's egg was saved by the Fire Guardian, Ignitus, who left it to drift down a river, hoping for the best. Adopted and raised by dragonflies, Spyro would soon discover who he is and his destiny to save his world and stop Malefor. Along the way, his adoptive dragonfly brother Sparx, follows Spyro loyally, helping Spyro find his way if he gets lost. Spyro would also encounter Cynder, a female dragon who was cursed by Malefor and was made to serve him. Cynder starts out as an antagonist, but later joins Spyro's side in the battle against Malefor's forces.

Games

A New Beginning 

A New Beginning marked the third title in the Spyro series to be released on the PlayStation 2 and the Nintendo GameCube, and the second on the Xbox, released in October 2006 and developed by Krome Studios. Portrayed as a reboot to the franchise, Spyro is sent on a quest to find the captured Guardian dragons so The Dark Master does not return from his prison. An evil dragoness that is because she was bewitched named Cynder uses her dark minions to harness the power of the four Guardian dragons (fire, electricity, ice, and earth) in order to open The Dark Master's prison, for bringing terror throughout the lands. The cast includes Elijah Wood as Spyro, David Spade as Sparx, Gary Oldman as Ignitus, Corey Burton as Volteer, Jeff Bennett as Cyril, Kevin Michael Richardson as Terrador, and Cree Summer as Cynder.

Although it was first advertised as a prequel to the first Spyro game, this game is in fact a reboot to the series, starting off from scratch and having nothing to do with the previous games. The Legend of Spyro: A New Beginning has received average, but mostly decent reviews and ratings from critics, often in agreement as being a good start for the trilogy, but open for improvement on the future installments as well.

The Eternal Night 

The Eternal Night was a sequel to A New Beginning, was released in October 2007 for the PlayStation 2, Game Boy Advance, Nintendo DS, and Wii consoles and was once again developed by Krome Studios. In this game, the Ape King Gaul planned to free the Dark Master from the Well of Souls on the Night of Eternal Darkness, and Spyro—having faced several visions of the threat from the Chronicler, an ancient, wise dragon—embarked on a journey to stop him. Elijah Wood, Gary Oldman, Corey Burton, Jeff Bennett, and Kevin Michael Richardson reprised their roles for the game, with Billy West taking over the role for Sparx, and Mae Whitman taking over the role for Cynder.

This entry also introduces an ability called "Dragon Time." This feature allows Spyro to slow down time around him, making certain platforming segments and combat in general easier.

The Eternal Night received less acclaim than its predecessor, usually in part to its difficulty, controls and usual linear setup. Regardless, its sales warranted for continuation, but also improvement of the trilogy.

Dawn of the Dragon 

Dawn of the Dragon is the third and final installment in The Legend of Spyro trilogy, as well as the tenth anniversary game of the series. It was released in October 2008 for the Xbox 360, Wii, PlayStation 2 and PlayStation 3 for North America, and was developed by Étranges Libellules. In the game, Spyro and Cynder awaken in the future, and set out to stop Malefor the Dark Master (the first purple dragon who turned evil), from spreading his evil across the world.

Unlike previous Spyro games, this game features the ability to switch between Spyro and Cynder at any time. There is also a two player mode, with two players either playing as Spyro and Cynder simultaneously. Along with this new freedom comes "Free Flight", which allows Spyro and Cynder to fly at any time. Once again, Elijah Wood, Gary Oldman, Corey Burton, Jeff Bennett, and Kevin Michael Richardson reprise their roles while Billy West is replaced as the voice of Sparx by Wayne Brady, Christina Ricci replaces Mae Whitman as the voice of Cynder, and Blair Underwood voices Hunter of Avalar. Mark Hamill does the voice for Malefor, the Dark Master.

Gameplay 
The trilogy features platforming gameplay similar to the rest of the Spyro series, though with a much heavier emphasis on combat. The levels in the games are linear in nature; the player guides Spyro along a set path, battling minor villains along the way, until he reaches a boss at the end of the level. The first game also features flying levels with rail-shooter gameplay.

Spyro is capable of both close-quarter and long-range combat. Long range attacks consist of a variety of elemental breaths, specifically fire, electricity, ice, and earth breath. Spyro learns these breaths at various points throughout the games. He can also expel large blasts of these elements in an attack called a "Fury." As Spyro uses his abilities, his magic meter is depleted. He can refill his meter and his health using specially colored gems found by defeating enemies and breaking parts of the environment. These gems can also be used to increase the strength of Spyro's attacks.

The Eternal Night introduces an ability called "Dragon Time." This feature allows Spyro to slow down time around him, making certain platforming segments and combat in general easier.

Dawn of the Dragon features a number of other alterations. Spyro is given the ability to fly at will, allowing for more exploration. The game also features a two-player co-op mode, with player two controlling Spyro's friend, Cynder. If player two is not active, then the player may switch between Spyro and Cynder during gameplay. Cynder has her own elemental breath powers as well, described as most uncommon abilities gained from her exposure to the darkness - poison, fear, wind and shadow.

Development 

Michael Graham, one of Sierra Entertainment producers of The Legend of Spyro trilogy, stated that they never planned to do a trilogy. They developed top line concepts for a story arc that they felt could potentially span over three games, yet no actual plans were made beyond A New Beginning, so they never really knew if the story would ever continue beyond A New Beginning.

The transition from traditional controllers in A New Beginning to the Wii remote in The Eternal Night proved challenging, as the cue system developed for the traditional controllers of the PlayStation 2 and GameCube didn't work for the Wii. The ultimate solution for this problem was found by Krome Studio's lead coder, who wrote a program to simulate how any action was performed, making it possible for developers to code that action for the Wii. However, the Wii Classic Controller can be used to play The Eternal Night on the Wii, since it is compatible.

Characters 
 Spyro is a purple dragon that prophecies say will direct the fate of his era. He is the main protagonist in The Legend of Spyro series. He is compassionate for others and always willing to help. He is voiced by Elijah Wood.
 Cynder was originally a large and powerful black dragon, who served as the primary antagonist in The Legend of Spyro: A New Beginning. Corrupted by Malefor, she is fully grown despite being the same age as Spyro. After being defeated, she returns to her normal size and becomes Spyro's companion. In the beginning of Dawn of the Dragon, the Chronicler reveals that due to Cynder's exposure to darkness at the hands of the Dark Master, she has access to powers that are not of the four native elements: Poison, Fear, Wind and Shadow. Near the end of Dawn of the Dragon, she admits that she loves Spyro. Cynder is also one of only two characters to have a different voice actor for all three Legend of Spyro games, being voiced by Cree Summer in A New Beginning, Mae Whitman in The Eternal Night and Christina Ricci in Dawn of the Dragon.
 Sparx is Spyro's foster brother and a dragonfly. Sparx serves primarily as a traveling companion and the comic relief character. Sparx is also one of only two characters to have a different voice actor for all three Legend of Spyro games, being voiced by David Spade in A New Beginning, Billy West in The Eternal Night and Wayne Brady in Dawn of the Dragon.
 Ignitus is a reddish-orange dragon and the Guardian of Fire. He is also the leader of the Four Dragon Guardians because of his brilliant strategies. He is the first Guardian Spyro meets at the beginning of his adventures, and due to Ignitus' very compassionate and caring demeanor, Spyro looks to Ignitus as a father figure. At the end of Dawn of the Dragon, he becomes the new age's Chronicler after taking over for the previous one. He is voiced by Gary Oldman.
 Volteer is a yellow dragon and the Guardian of Electricity. He is very smart, but he has a habit of talking too much. He also has a slight stutter. He is voiced by Corey Burton.
 Cyril is a light-blue dragon and the Guardian of Ice. He is a wise and proud dragon with a dry wit and a slightly pompous attitude. He is voiced by Jeff Bennett.
 Terrador is a green dragon and battle-scarred warrior, and the Guardian of Earth. Terrador is the most militant Guardian. Dedicated and focused on the practical arts of battle, he is straightforward and agenda-less. He judges everyone, Spyro included, not by looks, color or species, but how well they fight. He is voiced by Kevin Michael Richardson.
 Flash and Nina are the biological parents of Sparx and adoptive parents of Spyro. They find Spyro's egg, which hatches the same day as Sparx's egg, and raise Spyro as their adopted son. They are voiced by Jeff Bennett and Vanessa Marshall respectively in A New Beginning.
 Kane was introduced as proud and independent, refusing any help even when he was imprisoned. He was initially doubtful of Spyro's abilities at first, but soon grew to realize that Spyro can help him save his tribe. He is voiced by Phil LaMarr in A New Beginning.
 Mole-Yair is the leader of the Manweersmalls (A play on the phrase "Man We're Small"), a race of moles that takes refuge underground in the Munitions Forge to hide from the volcano, Mt. Boyzitbig. (Also another play on words, "Boy Is It Big".) He is mainly seen as a guiding figure, instructing Spyro to save his people and his brother, Exhumor, in exchange for information on Terrador's location. He is voiced by Jeff Bennett.
 Gaul is the Ape King, who plans to resurrect Malefor in The Legend of Spyro: The Eternal Night in order to obtain revenge on the dragons. He is killed by Dark Spyro in a fit of rage, and his minions are cursed by Malefor. Gaul is voiced by Kevin Michael Richardson.
 The Chronicler is an ancient gray dragon who is over 1,000 years old and possesses telekinesis. He knows the past, present and pieces of the future of every dragon ever born. He helps Spyro reawaken his powers through a series of dreams and visions. Characters speculate that he might be blind. It should be known that "The Chronicler" is more of a title than it is a name, and that the Chronicler's color is actually a symbol of status. (This is observed when Ignitus becomes the new Chronicler and takes on the teal color of the previous Chronicler). The Chronicler is voiced by Martin Jarvis.
 Hunter is a cheetah warrior who lives in the Valley of Avalar. In The Eternal Night, he has heard of Spyro and hopes that one day they will meet. In Dawn of the Dragon, Hunter finally meets Spyro after saving him, Sparx, and Cynder from the Catacombs on orders from Ignitus. He is voiced by Blair Underwood.
 Malefor, also known as the Dark Master, is the main antagonist of the trilogy. Malefor was said to be the first purple dragon ever to be born, but he later claimed that there were many before him. Being a purple dragon, he quickly learned to use every element despite not being a dragon of those elemental types. He developed a belief that the role of the purple dragons is to resurrect an ancient monster called The Destroyer and bring about the end of the world. Realizing that he was corrupt, the Ancients banished him, and his own monstrous power brought about his first downfall. The ruins of his first fortress became known as the Mountain of Malefor, or the Well of Souls, where the souls of evil beings gravitate towards. He was accidentally set free by Spyro and Cynder, and set about continuing his quest, and almost succeeded, but was defeated by Spyro and Cynder and sealed away forever by the spirits of the Ancients. He is voiced by Mark Hamill.

Universe

Locations 
The Dragon Temple was an ancient temple located not far from the swamp where Spyro was raised. It is used by the Guardians to train young dragons. It was abandoned after the events of The Eternal Night when the Guardians left for Warfang during the three-year time skip between the game and Dawn of the Dragon.

Items 
Gems are used as powerups themselves; red are collected to fill up Spyro's health bar, green are used to power his breath attacks, purple to power his fury attacks, and blue to upgrade his abilities in the main menu. In The Eternal Night, Dragon Relics are collectibles used to upgrade Spyro's health and magic bars, while Scriber's Quills are collectible items used to unlock concept art. Dragon Armor are collectibles in Dawn of the Dragon used to give Spyro and Cynder additional abilities in combat.

Music 
Rebecca Kneubuhl and Gabriel Mann, previously members of the a cappella band Spiralmouth who also composed musical pieces for Crash Twinsanity and Crash Tag Team Racing from Spyro'''s companion franchise Crash Bandicoot, composed many of the musical pieces for each game of The Legend of Spyro trilogy. Kneubuhl and Mann have also performed songs with lyrics which are based on the protagonist's bonds with his closest allies, such as "This Broken Soul" in The Eternal Night, and "Guide You Home (I Would Die for You)" in Dawn of the Dragon.

 Cast 
 Spyro - Elijah Wood
 Sparx - David Spade (2006), Billy West (2007), and Wayne Brady (2008)
 Cynder - Cree Summer (2006), Mae Whitman (2007), and Christina Ricci (2008)
 Ignitus - Gary Oldman
 Volteer, Exhumor, and Mason - Corey Burton
 Cyril, Mole-Yair, Flash (Sparx’s father) and Scratch - Jeff Bennett
 Terrador, The Conductor, Gaul, Sniff, Prowlus, and the Hermit - Kevin Michael Richardson
 Kane - Phil LaMarr
 Nina (Sparx’s mother) - Vanessa Marshall
 The Chronicler - Martin Jarvis
 Hunter of Avalar - Blair Underwood
 Meadow - Fred Tatasciore
 Malefor (the Dark Master) - Mark Hamill

 Cancelled animated film 
On October 25, 2007, it was announced that the film rights for Spyro the Dragon had been purchased by The Animation Picture Company.
Daniel and Steven Altiere wrote the script, which was going to be based on the recently released The Legend of Spyro trilogy. The film was going to be titled The Legend of Spyro 3D and was planned to be made from Los Angeles, California, with animation by a South Korean animation studio, Wonderworld Studios. The film was planned to be produced by John Davis, Dan Chuba, Mark A.Z. Dippé, Brian Manis, and Ash Shah, and distributed by Universal Pictures. Mark A.Z. Dippé was going to direct the film, which would've made it the first theatrical film Dippe directed since Spawn. This film was originally planned for released in theaters on Christmas 2009 for the United States and Canada, but it was delayed to April 10, 2010 for its North American release. It was later confirmed by Daniel Altiere himself that the movie had been officially cancelled due to decisions made by Activision to go in a different direction, which was later revealed in the form of Skylanders.

 Reception 

Critical reception of the games was mixed. IGN was highly impressed by A New Beginning, citing its story, voice acting, and controls as major positives. At one point, they compared the game to God of War. GameSpot, on the other hand, wasn't impressed, calling the story dull, the gameplay repetitive, and the levels uninspired.The Eternal Night was not as well received. IGN called the game "pointlessly difficult," citing an unresponsive jump button during platforming segments and "unfair" combat mechanics. GameSpot also complained about the high difficulty, saying that the game's "Dragon Time" was required to simply stay alive. Game Chronicles was kinder; while they did not like the game's lack of precision or its difficulty, and really did not like some of the acting, they also said that a patient player would find a lot about the game to like, particularly the production values.Dawn of the Dragon'' was better received than the previous two. IGN said that while the gameplay was still repetitive, the flight mechanic and other new features were welcome additions. GameZone was unimpressed by the game's graphics and multiplayer, but referred to the production values, including score and voice acting, as "epic." Impulse Gamer believed that the game was targeted at a young audience, who they say will enjoy the flight mechanic over all else.

Notes

References 

Spyro the Dragon
Activision Blizzard franchises
Video game franchises
Video game franchises introduced in 2006